Berger House in Abilene, Kansas is a Lustron house dating from 1949.  It was deemed to be architecturally significant as it is one of fewer than 100 Lustron houses remaining in Kansas.

It was listed on the National Register of Historic Places in 2007.

References

Houses on the National Register of Historic Places in Kansas
Houses completed in 1949
Houses in Dickinson County, Kansas
National Register of Historic Places in Dickinson County, Kansas